Dmitry Kochkin (born 25 April 1934 in Kirov) was a former Soviet Nordic combined skier who competed in the early 1960s. He won the silver in the individual event at the 1962 FIS Nordic World Ski Championships in Zakopane.

Kochkin also finished 5th in the individual event at the 1960 Winter Olympics in Squaw Valley.

External links

Soviet male Nordic combined skiers
Olympic Nordic combined skiers of the Soviet Union
Nordic combined skiers at the 1960 Winter Olympics
1934 births
Living people
FIS Nordic World Ski Championships medalists in Nordic combined
Sportspeople from Kirov, Kirov Oblast